IRIB Namayesh (Shibkâhi-ye Numayesh, 'Show channel') is a national film and TV series TV channel in Iran which was launched on January 25, 2012 and is the fourth Iranian television channel to broadcast in digital mode.  This channel is currently available in most provinces in Iran using digital Set-top boxes. Its sister channel is Tamasha TV that merged with Namayesh TV at December 2014, but then relaunched on 10 August 2016.

Popular programs
Frank Riva
Pasta
Faith
Fermentation Family
Gyebaek
Hong Gil-dong
Brain
The King's Dream

See also 
 Islamic Republic of Iran Broadcasting

References

External links

IRIB Namayesh Live streaming

Islamic Republic of Iran Broadcasting
Television stations in Iran
Persian-language television stations
Television channels and stations established in 2011
Movie channels
Classic television networks